The Kansas City Chiefs are a professional American football team based in Kansas City, Missouri. Center E. J. Holub was the initial first-round selection by made by the franchise. From 1960 to 1962, the Chiefs were known as the Dallas Texans until their relocation to Kansas City, Missouri. The team participated in the American Football League's annual player draft from 1960 to 1966 until the beginning of the common draft in 1967 and the AFL's subsequent merger with the National Football League in 1970.

The Chiefs have only had the first overall selection in the draft twice in franchise history, once in 2013 (Eric Fisher), the other in 1963 (Hall of Famer Buck Buchanan) when the team traded quarterback Cotton Davidson to the Oakland Raiders for the selection. The franchise has selected two players in the first round in the same year on six occasions, coming in 1963, 1968, 1979, 1984, 2008, and 2022.  The team has also traded away their first pick eight times, in 1973, 1975, 1993, 2001, 2004, 2016, 2018, 2019, and 2021. The Chiefs have never drafted a Heisman Trophy winner with their first round pick. Two first round picks never played for the Chiefs, Ronnie Bull (1962) and Gale Sayers (1965), who both elected to play for the Chicago Bears of the NFL instead of the AFL.

Only two of the Chiefs first-round picks are still on their roster, excluding the 2022 draft selections, quarterback Patrick Mahomes and running back Clyde Edwards-Helaire.

Player selections

By position
Like most teams in the NFL, the Chiefs have never drafted a fullback, placekicker, or punter in the first round of the NFL Draft. Running backs are the most commonly selected by the Chiefs in the first round, with 11 coming since 1960. Before selecting Patrick Mahomes in 2017, the Chiefs had gone 34 years in between selecting quarterbacks in the first round. Nine times the Chiefs have not had a first-round draft pick due to trades.

By  college
Five players have been chosen by the Chiefs from LSU in the first round of the NFL Draft, with three consecutive from 2007 to 2009, the most from any school. USC, Iowa, Tennessee and Penn State have all contributed three players to the Chiefs in the first round of the draft, all tied for second-most from one school.

References
General
Kansas City Chiefs 2007 NFL Draft Headquarters, Retrieved 22 July 2007.

Specific

Lists of first-round draft picks by National Football League team

first-round draft picks